Huang Qun (March 18, 1969 - ) is a former Chinese gymnast.  Huang competed at 1984 Summer Olympics and won a bronze medal in Women's Team competition.

References

Chinese female artistic gymnasts
Olympic bronze medalists for China
Living people
1967 births
Olympic medalists in gymnastics
Olympic gymnasts of China
Gymnasts at the 1984 Summer Olympics
Asian Games medalists in gymnastics
Gymnasts at the 1986 Asian Games
Medalists at the 1984 Summer Olympics
Asian Games gold medalists for China
Asian Games silver medalists for China
Medalists at the 1986 Asian Games
20th-century Chinese women